Bente Angell-Hansen (born 15 December 1951) is a Norwegian former diplomat and the current President of the EFTA Surveillance Authority (ESA). She served as Secretary-General of the Norwegian Ministry of Foreign Affairs from 2011 to 2014. Before going to the EFTA Surveillance Authority, she was Norway's Ambassador to Austria and Head of the Norwegian Mission to the United Nations in Vienna.

Early career
She holds a cand.polit. degree in political science, and started working for the Norwegian Ministry of Foreign Affairs in 1982. She was a deputy under-secretary of state in the Norwegian Office of the Prime Minister from 2000 to 2005, served as the Norwegian ambassador to Hungary from 2005 to 2007, and to the United Nations in Geneva from 2008.

Honors and recognition
In 2011, she was appointed the first female Secretary General of the Norwegian Ministry of Foreign Affairs. In 2012, the magazine Stat & Styring named her as the sixth most powerful civil servant of the Norwegian state and the magazine Kapital named her as Norway's tenth most powerful woman.

References

Norwegian civil servants
Ambassadors of Norway to Hungary
Permanent Representatives of Norway to the United Nations
1951 births
Living people
Norwegian women ambassadors